Henry William Brougham, was Dean of Lismore from 1884 until his death on 11 April 1913.

He was educated at Trinity College, Dublin  and began his ecclesiastical career with a curacy in Cork. He held incumbencies at Moynalty, and Eirke. He was Rural Dean of Rathdowney from  1870 to 1877.

References

Alumni of Trinity College Dublin
Deans of Lismore
1913 deaths
Year of birth missing